Al-Mughira ibn Ubaydallah ibn al-Mughira ibn Abd Allah ibn Mas'ada al-Fazari (died December 27, 749) was a governor of Egypt for the Umayyad Caliphate for a portion of 749.

A member of the Banu Fazara, al-Mughira is described by al-Kindi as being a descendant of Abd Allah ibn Mas'ada al-Fazari. Appointed to Egypt by the caliph Marwan II, he arrived in the province in March 749 and designated his son Abdallah as his chief of security (shurta). After spending some time in Alexandria, both al-Mughira and Abdallah suddenly died, bringing an end to al-Mughira's governorship after just ten months. Another of his sons, al-Walid, then temporarily assumed control of affairs in the province, but was soon replaced by Marwan's new governor Abd al-Malik ibn Marwan.

Notes

References
 
 

749 deaths
8th-century Arabs
8th-century Umayyad governors of Egypt
Ghatafan